The Royston Crow is a newspaper published in Royston, Hertfordshire, England. It was founded by John Warren in 1855.  The newspaper is now a weekly publication, part of the Archant group. The newspaper's name is taken from a local name for the bird hooded crow (Corvus cornix).

See also
 Carrion crow

Line notes

References
 C. Michael Hogan. 2009. Hooded Crow: Corvus cornix, GlobalTwitcher.com, ed, N. Stromberg
 Newspaper Press Directory. 1905. Volume 60, Great Britain 
 William White, Notes and Queries, Volume 199, Oxford University Press, 1954, p. 158

External links
 Website

Weekly newspapers published in the United Kingdom
Newspapers published in Hertfordshire
Publications established in 1855
Archant
Royston, Hertfordshire
Companies based in North Hertfordshire District
1855 establishments in England